Dynamin-2 is a protein that in humans is encoded by the DNM2 gene.

Function 

Dynamins represent one of the subfamilies of GTP-binding proteins. These proteins share considerable sequence similarity over the N-terminal portion of the molecule, which contains the GTPase domain. Dynamins are associated with microtubules. They have been implicated in cell processes such as endocytosis and cell motility, and in alterations of the membrane that accompany certain activities such as bone resorption by osteoclasts. Dynamins bind many proteins that bind actin and other cytoskeletal proteins. Dynamins can also self-assemble, a process that stimulates GTPase activity. Four alternatively spliced transcripts encoding different proteins have been described. Additional alternatively spliced transcripts may exist, but their full-length nature has not been determined.

Interactions 

DNM2 has been shown to interact with:
 SHANK1, 
 SHANK2, and
 SNX9.

Clinical relevance 

Mutations in this gene have been associated to cases of acute lymphoblastic leukaemia,
or congenital myopathy (centronuclear type).

References

Further reading

External links 
  GeneReviews/NIH/NCBI/UW entry on DNM2-Related Intermediate Charcot-Marie-Tooth Neuropathy or AD Charcot-Marie-Tooth Disease Type 2B
 HGNC Approved Gene Symbol: DNM2, Cytogenetic location: 19p13.2,Genomic coordinates (GRCh38): 19:10,718,052-10,831,909 (from NCBI)